The 1963–64 Segunda División season was the 33rd since its establishment and was played between 15 September 1963 and 26 April 1964.

Overview before the season
32 teams joined the league, including 4 relegated from the 1962–63 La Liga and 7 promoted from the 1962–63 Tercera División.

Relegated from La Liga
Mallorca
Deportivo La Coruña
Osasuna
Málaga

Promoted from Tercera División

Europa
Onteniente
Abarán
Atlético Ceuta
Badalona
Hospitalet
Algeciras

Group North

Teams

League table

Top goalscorers

Top goalkeepers

Results

Group South

Teams

League table

Top goalscorers

Top goalkeepers

Results

Promotion playoffs

First leg

Second leg

Relegation playoffs

First leg

Second leg

Tiebreaker

External links
BDFútbol

Segunda División seasons
2
Spain